The 1933 Cincinnati Reds season was their inaugural season in the National Football League. The team started 0–5-1, finished 3–6–1 and failed to qualify for the playoffs.

The Reds had one of the most anemic offenses in the history of the National Football league, setting records in futility for fewest yards, passing attempts, pass completions and passing touchdowns in a season.

Schedule

Standings

NFL Records
Fewest Yards Gained, Season, 1,150
Fewest Passes Attempted, Season, 102
Fewest Passes Completed, Season, 25
Fewest Touchdowns, Passing, Season, 0 (zero)

References

Cincinnati Reds (NFL) seasons
Cincinnati Reds (NFL)
Cincinnati Reds NFL